Gaston Malam (born 8 July 1952) is a Cameroonian sprinter. He competed in the men's 100 metres at the 1972 Summer Olympics.

References

External links
 

1952 births
Living people
Athletes (track and field) at the 1972 Summer Olympics
Cameroonian male sprinters
Olympic athletes of Cameroon
Place of birth missing (living people)